Mansoor Abdul Aziz Al-Shehail (Arabic: منصور عبد العزيز الشهيل; born 28 October 1995) is a Saudi Arabian professional wrestler. He is signed to WWE, where he performs on the Raw brand under the ring name mån.sôör, and is a member of Maximum Male Models. He is the first Saudi wrestler to have competed in WWE.

Professional wrestling career

Independent circuit (2015–2018)
Mansoor Al-Shehail was initially trained by the Stoner Brothers and Dory Funk Jr. In his early career, he worked under the names Manny Faberino and Big Money Manny on the independent circuit for various promotions including Hoodslam, All Pro Wrestling, Stoner Brothers University, Best of the West Wrestling, and Gold Rush Pro Wrestling. During this period, he won East Bay Pro Wrestling's main championship once, which he vacated upon signing with WWE.

WWE

Early beginnings (2018–2020)
Al-Shehail was one of eight participants WWE scouted during a tryout in Jeddah, Saudi Arabia ahead of 2018's Greatest Royal Rumble, WWE's first major event in Saudi Arabia, and was offered additional training at the WWE Performance Center in Orlando, Florida. He was featured in a segment during the event, where he and his fellow recruits partook in a physical altercation with Shawn Daivari and Ariya Daivari. Al-Shehail, under his "Manny Faberino" ring name, made his WWE debut at an NXT live event on 6 September 2018, losing to Luke Menzies. He made his television debut on the 6 February 2019 episode of NXT as "Mansoor", where he was defeated by Jaxson Ryker. Al-Shehail also provided the voice of Cole Quinn, one of the main characters in WWE 2K19s MyCareer mode, which he would reprise in WWE 2K20 the following year. 

At WWE's 2019 event Super ShowDown in Jeddah, Mansoor won a 51-Man Battle Royal, last eliminating Elias. At 2019's Crown Jewel, in his hometown, he defeated Cesaro. On 8 November 2019, he made his debut on 205 Live where he defeated The Brian Kendrick. At WWE's 2020 event Super ShowDown in Riyadh, Mansoor defeated Dolph Ziggler. Following this, Mansoor became a regular on 205 Live developing a winning streak on the show by defeating the likes of Ashante "Thee" Adonis, Brian Kendrick, and Jake Atlas.

Storyline with Mustafa Ali (2021–2022)
In early 2021, Mansoor began appearing on Main Event defeating the likes of Akira Tozawa, Angel Garza, and Drew Gulak extending his winning streak to 49–0. On the 3 May episode of Raw, Mansoor was assigned to the Raw brand, and made his in-ring debut the same night, losing to United States Champion Sheamus by disqualification due to interference from Sheamus' other rival Humberto Carrillo, and ending his winning streak. In June, Mansoor began a storyline with Mustafa Ali, who tried to convince him that the rest of WWE superstars were "backstabbers", "would do anything just to get ahead", and "cheaters", leading to a match on the 5 July episode of Raw, where Mansoor suffered his first pinfall loss, as Ali outsmarted him by faking a knee injury. On the 26 July episode of Raw, Mansoor teamed with Ali where they defeated T-Bar and Mace.

As part of the 2021 Draft, Mansoor was drafted to the SmackDown brand. On the 11 October episode of Raw, Mansoor was attacked by Ali in the backstage after they lost to The Hurt Business, ending their alliance between the two; Ali would challenge him to a match at Crown Jewel later that night. At the event, Mansoor defeated Ali.

Maximum Male Models (2022–present)
On April 22, 2022 in a dark segment on SmackDown, Mansoor was announced as the newest member of LA Knight's stable, Knight Model Management, alongside Mace, thus turning heel for the first time in his career. On the July 1 episode of SmackDown, Knight, now known as Max Dupri, announced Mace and Mansoor, under the tweaked names "ma.çé" and "mån.sôör", as his new tag team, Maximum Male Models. mån.sôör and Maximum Male Models joined Raw brand on February 6, 2023.

Personal life
In 2017, American actor Shia LaBeouf, Finnish artist Nastja Säde Rönkkö, and British artist Luke Turner launched a political livestreaming installation, He Will Not Divide Us, which Al-Shehail and a group of friends participated in. During his time on stream, he became known as Jihadi Jesus by fans, and most notably donned an eyepatch and sang "Snake Eater", the opening theme to the 2004 video game Metal Gear Solid 3: Snake Eater, and re-enacted the opening scene to the 2012 film The Dark Knight Rises.

On 27 April 2021, Al-Shehail married his girlfriend Mia Carey.

Championships and accomplishments
 East Bay Pro Wrestling
 EBPW Championship (1 time)
 Pro Wrestling Illustrated
 Ranked No. 181 of the top 500 singles wrestlers in the PWI 500 in 2021
 Wrestling Observer Newsletter
 Worst Gimmick (2022) as part of Maximum Male Models
 WWE
 51-Man Battle Royal

References

External links
 

1995 births
Living people
Saudi Arabian emigrants to the United States
Saudi Arabian professional wrestlers
21st-century professional wrestlers